Robert King (born 1959) is an American film and television writer and producer. He is married to Michelle King, who is also his writing partner. The couple created the legal drama series The Good Wife (2009–16), which earned them a Writers Guild of America Award; its spin-off The Good Fight (2017–2022); the comedy-drama BrainDead (2016); and Evil (2019–).

Personal life 
King attended Archbishop Mitty High School and Westmont College. King is of Irish and Italian descent. King met Michelle Stern in 1983 when as a senior at UCLA she worked part-time at FrontRunners athletic shoe store.  The couple married in 1987. They have one daughter, Sophia. A Catholic, he often attends Mass with The Good Fight lead actress Christine Baranski.

Career
King began his career writing the television movie, Imaginary Friends, in 1982, which starred veteran actors Peter Ustinov and Lilli Palmer, was directed by Michael Darlow. King later wrote the science fiction horror film The Nest (1988), and co-wrote Phantom of the Mall: Eric's Revenge, Under the Boardwalk and Bloodfist (all 1989).

King continued to write feature films throughout the 1990s, including Full Contact, Dragon Fire, Clean Slate, Speechless, Cutthroat Island and Red Corner. He directed the comedy film Principal Takes a Holiday in 1998. He co-wrote and directed Angels in the Infield (2000). He co-wrote and produced Vertical Limit. Robert and Michelle King co-created and co-produced the short-lived drama series In Justice in 2006.

They co-created a second, far more successful, legal drama series, The Good Wife, which ran for seven seasons from 2009 to 2016 on CBS. Aside from the pilot episode, they co-wrote the episodes "Stripped", "Unorthodox", "Hi", and twelve other episodes. King and the writing staff were nominated for a Writers Guild of America Award for Best New Series for The Good Wife.

Robert and Michelle King also created and produced the comedy thriller drama series BrainDead, which aired on CBS on June 13, 2016 thru October 17, 2016 before it was cancelled.  The couple then returned to their The Good Wife spin-off The Good Fight as showrunners. More recently, the King Size Productions company signed an overall deal with CBS Studios.

Filmography

Film

Television

Awards and nominations
King has been nominated for a Writers Guild of America Award for Best New Series for The Good Wife.

References

External links
 

Living people
American television producers
American television writers
American male television writers
Place of birth missing (living people)
Showrunners
Westmont College alumni
Writers Guild of America Award winners
1955 births
American Roman Catholics